A town square (or square, plaza, public square, city square, urban square, or piazza) is an open public space, commonly found in the heart of a traditional town but not necessarily a true geometric square, used for community gatherings. Related concepts are the civic center, the market square and the village green.

Most squares are hardscapes suitable for open markets, concerts, political rallies, and other events that require firm ground. Being centrally located, town squares are usually surrounded by small shops such as bakeries, meat markets, cheese stores, and clothing stores. At their center is often a well, monument, statue or other feature. Those with fountains are sometimes called fountain squares.

By country

Australia
The city centre of Adelaide and the adjacent suburb of North Adelaide, in South Australia, were planned by Colonel William Light in 1837. The city streets were laid out in a grid plan, with the city centre including a central public square, Victoria Square, and four public squares in the centre of each quarter of the city. North Adelaide has two public squares. The city was also designed to be surrounded by park lands, and all of these features still exist today, with the squares maintained as mostly green spaces.

China

In Mainland China, People's Square is a common designation for the central town square of modern Chinese cities, established as part of urban modernization within the last few decades. These squares are the site of government buildings, museums and other public buildings. One such square, Tiananmen Square, is a famous site in Chinese history due to it being the site of the May Fourth Movement, the Proclamation of the People's Republic of China, the 1976 Tiananmen Incident, the 1989 Tiananmen Square Protests, and all Chinese National Day Parades.

Germany

The German word for square is Platz, which also means "Place", and is a common term for central squares in German-speaking countries. These have been focal points of public life in towns and cities from the Middle Ages to today. Squares located opposite a Palace or Castle are commonly named Schlossplatz. Prominent Plätze include the Alexanderplatz, Pariser Platz and Potsdamer Platz in Berlin, Heldenplatz in Vienna, and the Königsplatz in Munich.

Indonesia

A large open square common in villages, towns and cities of Indonesia is known as alun-alun. It is a Javanese term which in modern-day Indonesia refers to the two large open squares of kraton compounds. It is typically located adjacent a mosque or a palace. It is a place for public spectacles, court celebrations and general non-court entertainments.

Iran

In traditional Persian architecture, town squares are known as maydan or meydan. A maydan is considered one of the essential features in urban planning and they are often adjacent to bazaars, large mosques and other public buildings. Naqsh-e Jahan Square in Isfahan and Azadi Square in Tehran are examples of classic and modern squares.

Italy

A piazza is a city square in Italy, Malta, along the Dalmatian coast and in surrounding regions. San Marco in Venice may be the world's best known. The term is roughly equivalent to the Spanish plaza. In Ethiopia, it is used to refer to a part of a city.

When the Earl of Bedford developed Covent Garden – the first private-venture public square built in London – his architect Inigo Jones surrounded it with arcades, in the Italian fashion. Talk about the piazza was connected in Londoners' minds not with the square as a whole, but with the arcades.

A piazza is commonly found at the meeting of two or more streets. Most Italian cities have several piazzas with streets radiating from the center. Shops and other small businesses are found on piazzas as it is an ideal place to set up a business. Many metro stations and bus stops are found on piazzas as they are key point in a city.

In Britain, piazza now generally refers to a paved open pedestrian space, without grass or planting, often in front of a significant building or shops. King's Cross station in London is to have a piazza as part of its redevelopment. The piazza will replace the existing 1970s concourse and allow the original 1850s façade to be seen again. There is a good example of a piazza in Scotswood at Newcastle College.

In the United States, in the early 19th century, a piazza by further extension became a fanciful name for a colonnaded porch. Piazza was used by some, especially in the Boston area, to refer to a verandah or front porch of a house or apartment.

A central square just off Gibraltar's Main Street, between the Parliament Building and the City Hall officially named John Mackintosh Square is colloquially referred to as The Piazza.

The Netherlands and Belgium

In the Low Countries, squares are often called "markets" because of their usage as marketplaces. The Dutch word for square is plein, which is another common name for squares in Dutch-speaking regions (for example Het Plein in The Hague).

In the 17th and 18th centuries, another type of square emerged, the so-called royal square. Such squares did not serve as a marketplace but were built in front of large palaces or public buildings to emphasise their grandeur, as well as to accommodate military parades and ceremonies, among others (for example the Place Royale in Brussels and the Koningsplein in Amsterdam). Palace squares are usually more symmetrical than their older market counterparts.

Russia

In Russia, central square (romanised: tsentráĺnaya plóshchad́) is a common term for an open area in the heart of the town. In a number of cities, the square has no individual name and is officially designated Central Square, for example Central Square (Tolyatti).

South Korea 

Gwanghwamun Plaza (Korean: 광화문광장) also known as Gwanghwamun Square) is a public open space on Sejongno, Jongno-gu, Seoul, South Korea. It against the background of A Gwanghwamun Gate(Korean: 광화문).

In 2009, Restoration of Gwanghwamun Gate  made the gate’s front space as a public plaza. The square has been renovated to modern style has new waterways & rest Areas, exhibition Hall for Excavated Cultural Assets in 2022 Aug.

Spanish-speaking countries

It comes from Latin , with the meaning of 'broad street' or 'public square'. Ultimately coming from Greek  plateia (hodos), it is a cognate of Italian  and French  (which has also been borrowed into English).

The term is used across Spanish-speaking territories in Spain and the Americas, as well as in the Philippines. The plaza might be large enough to serve as a military parade ground. At times of crisis or fiestas, it serves as the gathering space for large crowds.

Diminutives of  include  and the latter's double diminutive , which can be occasionally used as a particle in a proper noun.

Like the Italian  and the Portuguese , the plaza remains a center of community life that is only equaled by the market-place. A  is a bullring. "shopping center".

United Kingdom
In the United Kingdom, and especially in London and Edinburgh, a "square" has a wider meaning. There are public squares of the type described above but the term is also used for formal open spaces surrounded by houses with private gardens at the centre, sometimes known as garden squares. Most of these were built in the 18th and 19th centuries. In some cases the gardens are now open to the public. See the Squares in London category. Additionally, many public squares were created in towns and cities across the UK as part of urban redevelopment following the Blitz. Squares can also be quite small and resemble courtyards, especially in the City of London. In London the most impressive example which does not incorporate gardens and which is surrounded by historic buildings is probably Trafalgar Square.

United States

In some cities, especially in New England, the term "square" (as its Spanish equivalent, plaza) is applied to a commercial area (like Central Square in Cambridge, Massachusetts), usually formed around the intersection of three or more streets, and which originally consisted of some open area (many of which have been filled in with traffic islands and other traffic calming features). Many of these intersections are irregular rather than square.

The placita (Spanish for "little plaza"), as it is known in the Southwestern United States, is a common feature within the boundaries of the former provincial kingdom of Santa Fe de Nuevo México. They are a blend of Hispano and Pueblo design styles, several of which continue to be hubs for cities and towns in New Mexico, including Santa Fe Plaza, Old Town Albuquerque, Acoma Pueblo's plaza, Taos Downtown Historic District, Mesilla Plaza, Mora, and Las Vegas Plaza.

In U.S. English, a plaza can mean one of several things:
 a town square, as in the Spanish usage
 "any open area usually located near urban buildings and often featuring walkways, trees and shrubs, places to sit, and sometimes shops"
 a shopping center of any size
 a toll plaza, where traffic must temporarily stop to pay tolls
 an area adjacent to an expressway that has service facilities (such as restaurants, gas stations, and restrooms)

Today's metropolitan landscapes often incorporate the plaza as a design element, or as an outcome of zoning regulations, building budgetary constraints, and the like. Sociologist William H. Whyte conducted an extensive study of plazas in New York City: his study humanized the way modern urban plazas are conceptualized, and helped usher in significant design changes in the making of plazas. They can be used to open spaces for low-income neighborhoods, and can also the overall aesthetic of the surrounding area boosting economic vitality, pedestrian mobility and safety for pedestrians. Most plazas are created out of a collaboration between local non-profit applicants and city officials which requires approval from the city.

Throughout North America, words like place, square, or plaza frequently appear in the names of commercial developments such as shopping centers and hotels.

See also

 Cathedral Square
 List of city squares
 List of city squares by size
 Urban vitality

References

External links

 Pitlane Magazine.com: "The Hidden Origin of the Town Square"
 BBC.com: "The Violent History of Public Squares"
 "This research initiative is an attempt to rediscover the lost or neglected urban symbols. The Urban Square is a city's 'heart and soul' and that is the focus of this project."

01
Parks
Square
.
Landscape architecture
Protected areas
Road infrastructure
Subnational parks
Urban design
Urban studies and planning terminology